A hogan is a Navajo dwelling.

Hogan may also refer to:

People:
Hogan (surname)
Hogan (given name)

Places:
Hogan, Missouri, a community in the United States
Hogan Island, in southeastern Australia, largest of Hogan's Group
Hogan Township, Pope County, Arkansas
Hogan Township, Dearborn County, Indiana
Hogan River, a tributary of the Boisvert River in Quebec, Canada

Other uses:
Hogan Cup, an Irish football championship trophy
Hogan's Fountain Pavilion
Hogan Racing, an American car racing team
USS Hogan (DD-178) (1919–1945), a United States Navy destroyer
Hogan Hall, primarily a dormitory of Columbia University
Hogan Preparatory Academy, a charter high school in Kansas City, Missouri
Hogan's Heroes, an American TV series
Hogan (band), an Irish pop rock band
Hogan Wings, a model aircraft brand owned by Herpa Wings
Hogan (brand), a shoe trademark made by Tod's

See also
Hogan Gang, a Prohibition-era criminal organization based in St. Louis, Missouri
Happy Hogan (comics), a fictional character in the Marvel Comics Universe